The Main road 46 is a northwest-southeast direction Secondary class main road in the Tiszántúl, which connection old Market towns in Alföld region of Hungary, that connects the Main road 4 change to the Main road 47, facilitating access from Törökszentmiklós to Mezőberény. The road is 66 km long.

The road, as well as all other main roads in Hungary, is managed and maintained by Magyar Közút, state owned company.

Sources

See also

 Roads in Hungary
 Transport in Hungary

External links

 Hungarian Public Road Non-Profit Ltd. (Magyar Közút Nonprofit Zrt.)
 National Infrastructure Developer Ltd.

Main roads in Hungary
Transport in Jász-Nagykun-Szolnok County
Békés County